

Rudolf von Bünau (19 August 1890 – 14 January 1962) was a German general in the Wehrmacht during World War II who commanded several corps. He was a recipient of the Knight's Cross of the Iron Cross with Oak Leaves of Nazi Germany. His son, also named Rudolf von Bünau, was awarded the Knight's Cross of the Iron Cross on 8 August 1943; he was killed in action just one week later on 15 August 1943 south of Roslavl. His other son, Günther von Bünau was also killed in action in 1943.

According to documents released by the Bundesnachrichtendienst in 2014, Rudolf von Bünau, led a "group staff" of the Schnez-Truppe, a German secret paramilitary force established by Nazi veterans in 1949.

Awards and decorations
 Iron Cross (1914) 2nd Class (9 September 1914) & 1st Class (14 November 1914)
 Clasp to the Iron Cross (1939) 2nd Class (1 October 1939) & 1st Class (5 October 1939)

 German Cross in Gold on 23 January 1943 as Generalleutnant and commander of the 73. Infanterie-Division
 Knight's Cross of the Iron Cross with Oak Leaves
 Knight's Cross on 15 August 1940 as Oberst and commander of Infanterie-Regiment 133
 766th Oak Leaves on 5 March 1945 as General der Infanterie and commander of XI.Armeekorps

References

Citations

Bibliography

 
 
 

1890 births
1962 deaths
Military personnel from Stuttgart
German Army generals of World War II
Generals of Infantry (Wehrmacht)
German Army personnel of World War I
Recipients of the clasp to the Iron Cross, 1st class
Recipients of the Gold German Cross
Recipients of the Knight's Cross of the Iron Cross with Oak Leaves
German prisoners of war in World War II held by the United States
People from the Kingdom of Württemberg

Road incident deaths in Germany
Reichswehr personnel